The Civil Rights Act of 1875, sometimes called the Enforcement Act or the Force Act, was a United States federal law enacted during the Reconstruction era in response to civil rights violations against Indigenous Americans. The bill was passed by the 43rd United States Congress and signed into law by United States President Ulysses S. Grant on March 1, 1875. The act was designed to "protect all citizens in their civil and legal rights", providing for equal treatment in public accommodations and public transportation and prohibiting exclusion from jury service. It was originally drafted by Senator Charles Sumner in 1870, but was not passed until shortly after Sumner's death in 1875. The law was not effectively enforced, partly because President Grant had favored different measures to help him suppress election-related violence against blacks and Republicans in the Southern United States.

The Reconstruction era ended with the resolution of the 1876 presidential election, and the Civil Rights Act of 1875 was the last federal civil rights law enacted until the passage of Civil Rights Act of 1957. In 1883, the Supreme Court ruled in the Civil Rights Cases that the public accommodation sections of the act were unconstitutional, saying Congress was not afforded control over private persons or corporations under the Equal Protection Clause. Parts of the Civil Rights Act of 1875 were later re-adopted in the Civil Rights Act of 1964 and the Civil Rights Act of 1968, both of which cited the Commerce Clause as the source of Congress's power to regulate private actors.

Legislative history
The drafting of the bill was performed early in 1870 by United States Senator Charles Sumner, a dominant Radical Republican in the Senate, with the assistance of John Mercer Langston, a prominent African American who established the law department at Howard University. The bill was proposed by Senator Sumner and co-sponsored by Representative Benjamin F. Butler, both Republicans from Massachusetts, in the 41st Congress of the United States in 1870.  Congress removed the coverage of public schools that Sumner had included. The act was passed by the 43rd Congress in February 1875 as a memorial to honor Sumner, who had just died.  It was signed into law by United States President Ulysses S. Grant on March 1, 1875.

Enforcement
President Grant had wanted an entirely different law to help him suppress election-related violence against blacks and Republicans in the South.  Congress did not give him that, but instead wrote a law for equal rights to public accommodations that was passed as a memorial to Grant's bitterest enemy, the late Senator Charles Sumner.  Grant never commented on the 1875 law, and did nothing to enforce it, says historian John Hope Franklin.  Grant's Justice Department ignored it and did not send copies to US attorneys, says Franklin, while many federal judges called it unconstitutional before the Supreme Court shut it down. Franklin concludes regarding Grant and Hayes administrations, "The Civil Rights Act was never effectively enforced."  Public opinion was opposed, with the black community in support. Historian Rayford Logan looking at newspaper editorials finds the press was overwhelmingly opposed.

Case law

The Supreme Court, in an 8–1 decision, declared sections of the act unconstitutional in the Civil Rights Cases on October 15, 1883. Justice John Marshall Harlan provided the lone dissent. The Court held the Equal Protection Clause within the Fourteenth Amendment prohibits discrimination by the state and local government, but it does not give the federal government the power to prohibit discrimination by private individuals and organizations. The Court also held that the Thirteenth Amendment was meant to eliminate "the badge of slavery," but not to prohibit racial discrimination in public accommodations. The Civil Rights Act of 1875 was the last federal civil rights bill signed into law until the Civil Rights Act of 1957, enacted during the Civil Rights Movement.

Legacy
The Civil Rights Act of 1875 is notable as the last major piece of legislation related to Reconstruction that was passed by Congress during the Reconstruction era. These include the Civil Rights Act of 1866, the four Reconstruction Acts of 1867 and 1868, the three Enforcement Acts of 1870 and 1871, and the three Constitutional Amendments adopted between 1865 and 1870.

Provisions contained in the Civil Rights Act of 1875 were later readopted by Congress during the Civil Rights Movement as part of the Civil Rights Act of 1964 and the Civil Rights Act of 1968. The 1964 and 1968 acts relied upon the Commerce Clause contained in Article One of the Constitution of the United States rather than the Equal Protection Clause within the Fourteenth Amendment.

See also
United States labor law
Equality Act (United States), proposed Act seeking to prevent discrimination in public accommodations

References

Bibliography
 

, Third Part, Chapter VI, "The Supreme Court Decision."

Further reading

Books

Encyclopedias

Monographs

Dissertations and theses

Journals

External links

Congressional Records
 Congressional Record: Congressional Globe (1833-1873) Provides an index to the "History of Senate Bills and Joint Resolutions" for Senate bill S. 1 during 1873. Retrieved November 18, 2012
 Congressional Record: House Proceedings, 1874 Provides an index to the "History of Senate Bills and Joint Resolutions" for House bill H.R. 796 during 1874. Retrieved November 18, 2012

Other
 Benjamin F. Butler, "Civil Rights: Speech of Hon. Benjamin F. Butler, of Massachusetts, in the House of Representatives, January 7, 1874," From the Digital Archive Collections of the Mount St. Mary's University.  Retrieved October 15, 2014 
 "Civil Rights Bill of 1875", The Fifteenth Amendment in Flesh and Blood: Legislative Interests Provides a detailed description of the history of the bill from 1870 until its passage by Congress in 1875. Retrieved November 18, 2012
 History Crush: Charles Sumner, Prologue: Pieces of History, The National Archives.gov Provides a short biographical account of Sen. Charles Sumner including details surrounding his efforts to pass the Civil Rights bill in Congress. Includes images of Sumner, personal documents, and bill S. 1 that would later lead to the Civil Rights Act of 1875. Retrieved November 18, 2012
 Summary of Constitutional Amendments and Major Civil Rights Acts passed by Congress Part of the Black Americans in Congress, 1870–2007 series. Provided by the Office of History and Preservation under the Office of the Clerk of the U.S. House of Representatives. Retrieved November 18, 2012
 "The Trouble has Commenced - A Tale of Anxiety" by Thomas Nast in Harper's Weekly. From The New York Times "On This Day" series. Recounts the events on the floor of the House in the United States Congress involving the Civil Rights Bill on February 27, 1875. Retrieved March 16, 2013
 "How Some People Regard the Passage of the Civil Rights Bill" Published in the Daily Graphic on March 3, 1875. From the Old Fulton website. Presents a detractors view on the outcome of the Civil Right Bill.  Retrieved July 5, 2014
 Digitized image of Charles Sumners' senate bill S. 1 as introduced during the 43rd United States Congress.  From the  Records of the U.S. House of Representatives.  Retrieved May 18, 2015
 "Some Memories of A Long Life" An excerpt from the memoir of Malvina Shanklin Harlan, the wife of Justice John Marshall Harlan.  The excerpt chronicles the effort that Justice Harlan placed into writing an opinion for the Civil Rights Cases (1883).  From the Library of Congress.  Retrieved May 18, 2015

1875 in American law
Anti-discrimination law in the United States
Presidency of Ulysses S. Grant
Reconstruction Era legislation
Civil Rights Acts